Pernell McPhee (born December 17, 1988) is an American football outside linebacker who is a free agent. He was drafted by the Ravens in the fifth round of the 2011 NFL Draft out of Mississippi State. He has also played for the Chicago Bears and Washington Redskins.

Early years
Pernell attended Pahokee High School, where he was teammates with Dwight Bentley and Janoris Jenkins. McPhee only played one year of high school football and started on both sides of the ball, playing offensive tackle and defensive end. He registered 75 total tackles, including 35 tackles for loss and 19 quarterback sacks to go along with 12 forced fumbles as a senior. He helped lead Pahokee to a 14–0 record that included a 25–11 win over John Brantley's Ocala Trinity Catholic for the 2006 FHSAA Class 2B State Championship. McPhee was named all-state following that season. In addition to his exploits on the football field, he was also a two-year starter in basketball. He originally signed with the University of Southern Mississippi out of high school before going the community college route.

College career

Itawamaba Community College
Spent the first two years of his college career at Itawamba Community College in Fulton, Mississippi where he was named an NJCAA All-American as a sophomore, a season in which he led the nation with 13.5 sacks. During his career at ICC, he tallied 124 tackles (92 solo), 32.5 sacks, 73.5 TFL, 47 QB pressures, and 4 FFs in 18 games. In 2019, McPhee was selected to the ICC Athletic Hall of Fame.

Mississippi State University
After completing his two years at ICC he transferred to Mississippi State. He was named to the coaches All-SEC first-team as a senior in 2010 and was named first-team All-SEC as a junior in 2009. He served as a team captain in 2010. During his MSU career he started all 25 of the games in which he appeared and totaled 91 tackles (46 solo), 7 sacks, 22 TFL, 20 QB pressures, 2 FFs, and 4 pass breakups. In 2009, he was twice named the SEC Defensive Lineman of the week.

Professional career

Baltimore Ravens
McPhee was drafted by the Baltimore Ravens in the fifth round with the 165th overall pick of the 2011 NFL Draft. McPhee collected 6.0 sacks as a rookie for the Ravens in 2011, plus 23 tackles and a forced fumble while playing in all 16 regular season games. On January 12, 2013, in the AFC Divisional Playoff against the Denver Broncos, McPhee recorded a strip-sack on quarterback Peyton Manning. The Ravens would go on win that game 38-35 in double overtime. On January 20, 2013, in the AFC Championship against the New England Patriots, McPhee tipped a pass from quarterback Tom Brady that led to an interception by Dannell Ellerbe with 6:49 remaining in regulation. This led to the Ravens winning that game 28-13 and earning a trip to Super Bowl XLVII, where they would defeat the San Francisco 49ers by a score of 34-31. McPhee switched from defensive end to outside linebacker for the 2013 season.

In the 2014 season, McPhee finished with a career high 7.5 sacks and a forced fumble.

Chicago Bears
On March 10, 2015, McPhee signed a five-year contract with the Chicago Bears. On September 27 on the road at CenturyLink Field, McPhee came up with two back to back sacks in a 0–26 loss to the Seattle Seahawks. In the 2015 season, McPhee led the team with 18 quarterback hits. McPhee started the 2016 season on the PUP list with a knee injury. He was activated to the active roster on October 20, 2016. In 2017, McPhee played in 13 games with five starts before suffering a shoulder injury in Week 15. He was placed on injured reserve on December 20, 2017. On February 26, 2018, McPhee was released.

Washington Redskins

On March 26, 2018 McPhee signed a one-year, $1.8 million contract with the Washington Redskins.

Baltimore Ravens (second stint)
On May 17, 2019, McPhee signed with the Baltimore Ravens. He was placed on injured reserve on October 21, 2019, with a triceps injury.

On May 12, 2020, McPhee re-signed with the Ravens. He was placed on the reserve/COVID-19 list by the team on November 24, 2020 and activated on December 4, 2020.

On March 16, 2021, McPhee signed a one-year contract extension with the Ravens. On November 20, 2021, McPhee was placed on injured reserve with an knee injury. He was activated on December 20, 2021.

References

External links
 Mississippi State bio
 Baltimore Ravens bio
 Chicago Bears bio
 Washington Redskins bio

1988 births
Living people
Players of American football from Orlando, Florida
American football defensive ends
American football linebackers
Mississippi State Bulldogs football players
People from Pahokee, Florida
Baltimore Ravens players
Chicago Bears players
Washington Redskins players
Pahokee High School alumni
Ed Block Courage Award recipients